The Chosin Reservoir, formally known as Lake Changjin is a lake located in Changjin County, North Korea. It is most famously known for being the site of the Battle of the Chosin Reservoir, which was an important battle in the Korean War.

Geography 
Chosin Reservoir is a man-made lake located in the northeast of the Korean peninsula. The name Chosin is the Japanese pronunciation of the Korean place name Changjin, and the name stuck due to the outdated Japanese maps used by UN forces. Through these roads, Yudami-ni and Sinhung-ni, located at the west and east side of the reservoir respectively, are connected at Hagaru-ri (now Changjin-ŭp). From there, the road passes through Koto-ri and eventually leads to the port of Hungnam. The area around the Chosin Reservoir was sparsely populated. The battle was fought over some of the roughest terrain during some of the harshest winter weather conditions of the Korean War. The road was created by cutting through the hilly terrain of Korea, with steep climbs and drops. Dominant peaks, such as the Funchilin Pass and the Toktong Pass, overlook the entire length of the road. The road's quality was poor, and in some places it was reduced to a one lane gravel trail. The cold weather was accompanied by frozen ground, creating considerable danger of frostbite casualties, icy roads, and weapon malfunctions. Medical supplies froze; morphine syrettes had to be defrosted in a medic's mouth before they could be injected; frozen blood plasma was useless on the battlefield. Even cutting off clothing to deal with a wound risked gangrene and frostbite. Batteries used for the Jeeps and radios did not function properly in the temperature and quickly ran down. The lubrication in the guns gelled and rendered them useless in battle. Likewise, the springs on the firing pins would not strike hard enough to fire the round, or would jam.

History 

The Battle of the Chosin Reservoir took place about a month after the People's Republic of China entered the Korean War and sent the People's Volunteer Army (PVA) 9th Army to infiltrate the northeastern part of North Korea. On 27 November 1950, the Chinese force surprised the US X Corps commanded by Major General Edward Almond at the Chosin Reservoir area. A brutal 17-day battle in freezing weather soon followed. Between 27 November and 13 December, 30,000 United Nations Command troops (later nicknamed "The Chosin Few") under the field command of Major General Oliver P. Smith were encircled and attacked by about 120,000 Chinese troops under the command of Song Shilun, who had been ordered by Mao Zedong to destroy the UN forces. The UN forces were nevertheless able to break out of the encirclement and to make a fighting withdrawal to the port of Hungnam, inflicting heavy casualties on the Chinese. The retreat of the US Eighth Army from northwest Korea in the aftermath of the Battle of the Ch'ongch'on River and the evacuation of the X Corps from the port of Hungnam in northeast Korea marked the complete withdrawal of UN troops from North Korea.

Other pages 
 Battle of Chosin Reservoir

Notes 
Footnotes

Citations

References 

 
 
 
 
 
 

Lakes of Korea